Major General Coote Manningham (1765–1809) was a British army officer who played a significant role in the creation and early development of the 95th Rifles of which he was Colonel in Chief.

Military career
Born the second son of Charles Manningham of Surrey, Manningham began his career as a subaltern in the 39th Foot serving under his uncle, Sir Robert Boyd, at the Siege of Gibraltar. On the outbreak of the French Revolutionary Wars in 1793, he was appointed as Major to the light infantry battalion where he fought in the Caribbean. He became Lieutenant-Colonel of the 81st Foot and then adjutant-general in Santo Domingo, under the command of Lieutenant-General Forbes.

In early 1800, Colonel Manningham and Lieutenant-Colonel William Stewart proposed, and were given the assignment, to use what they had learned while leading light infantry to train the Experimental Corps of Riflemen, later to become the 95th Rifles and then the Rifle Brigade. That summer the new corps was trained in exercises developed by Manningham and were quickly deployed to provide covering fire to the amphibious landings at Ferrol.

Manningham died 26 August, 1809 in Maidstone from illness contracted during the Retreat to Corunna in the opening stage of the Peninsular War in which the 95th Rifles were to demonstrate the tactical value of the approach developed by Manningham and Stewart. He is buried in the churchyard of All Saints in Little Bookham but a memorial is also placed in the west aisle of the north transept in Westminster Abbey.

The inscription under the monument by John Bacon honoring Manningham in Westminster Abbey conveys the esteem in which he was held by his contemporaries:
The distinguished soldier to whom friendship erects this inadequate memorial, began his career of military action at the siege of Gibraltar, and concluded it at the victory of Corunna, to which his skill and gallantry conspicuously contributed. He fell an early victim to the vicissitudes of climate, and the severities of war, and died 26th Aug., 1809, aged forty-four. Yet, reader, regard not his fate as premature, since his cup of glory was full, and he was not summoned till his virtue and patriotism had achieved even here a brilliant recompense: for his name is engraved on the annals of his country. In him the man and the Christian tempered the warrior, and England might proudly present him to the world as the model of a British soldier.

After his death his post as Colonel in Chief of the 95th Rifles was filled by Sir David Dundas.

Family

Around 1800 he was married to Anna Maria Pollen (1783-1822), daughter of Rev George Pollen of Little Bookham.

References

British Army personnel of the Napoleonic Wars
1765 births
1809 deaths
British military personnel killed in action in the Napoleonic Wars